Rita Rani Ahuja is an American actress and producer. She is perhaps best known for directing Bombay Skies and voicing Alexandrite on the Cartoon Network television series Steven Universe.

Awards and nominations
Ahuja's short film Bombay Skies won numerous awards, including Best Short Film at the 2008 LA Femme Film Festival in Los Angeles. She also won the 2003 Images Award from the Filmi Film Festival in Toronto, Canada for her work as an actress in the feature film Trade Offs.

Filmography

References

External links

Living people
21st-century American actresses
American film actresses
American voice actresses
Year of birth missing (living people)